Zombie High (also known as The School That Ate My Brain) is a 1987 American comedy horror film directed by Ron Link. The film was released theatrically on October 2, 1987, and stars Virginia Madsen as a beautiful young teenager who must fight against a boarding school that is intent on turning everyone into a Stepford-esque "perfect" student.

Plot
Andrea (Virginia Madsen) is a teenage girl that has won a scholarship to Ettinger, a formerly all-male boarding school. She leaves behind her boyfriend Barry (James Wilder) in the hopes of scholastic achievement, but soon discovers that things are not as they seem at Ettinger. Andrea finds that her friends are slowly changing from regular teenagers into personality-less drones. Some investigation shows that the school's faculty has been harvesting life-sustaining chemicals from the student body, which results in them becoming seemingly perfect students that are only focused on doing well in school and obeying rules. Andrea is spared from this fate by one of her professors, Philo (Richard Cox), who takes pity on her due to her resemblance to a former lover. Along with her boyfriend, Andrea discovers that the staff uses classical music as a way of stabilizing the students. Philo gives her a tape to play over the loudspeaker system that he claims will stop the faculty and students from capturing her and turning her into a zombie, only for her to lose it while she is chased by the school's students. With nothing to lose, Barry plays a tape of rock music in its place, which accomplishes the desired task of stopping the students and saving their lives.

Cast
Virginia Madsen as Andrea
Paul Feig as Emerson
Sherilyn Fenn as Suzi
Clare Carey as Mary Beth
Scott Coffey as Felner
Richard Cox as Philo
Kay E. Kuter as Dean Beauregard Eisner
Henry Sutton as Bell
Walter Addison as Chief Hillis
Christopher Peters as Phillip
Christopher Crews as Biff
James Wilder as Barry
John Sack as Senator Felner
Paul Williams as Ignatius
Susan Barnes as Mom
 Jeff Morgan as  Zombie student
 Tease (Music Band, with Kipper Jones, Derek Organ and Tommy Organ) as themself

Reception
Lana Cooper of Brutal as Hell wrote, "For unintentional humor and as an ‘80s genre horror timepiece, Zombie High cannot be beat. Just don’t expect to be scared." The Chicago Tribune panned the film in a 1988 review, expressing surprise that Madsen would star in Zombie High, as they viewed it as a step down from her previous acting work.  Michael Wilmington of the Los Angeles Times called it "a student project gone awry".  Glenn Kay, who wrote Zombie Movies: The Ultimate Guide, called the film a "nondescript, forgettable flick".  Writing in The Zombie Movie Encyclopedia, academic Peter Dendle said, "The movie plays the concept more seriously than the title lets on, and, in fact, winds up dragging quite a bit."

References

External links
 
 
 
 

1987 films
1987 horror films
1980s comedy horror films
1980s high school films
1980s teen comedy films
1980s teen horror films
American high school films
American teen comedy films
American teen horror films
American zombie comedy films
Films set in boarding schools
1980s English-language films
Films shot in Los Angeles
1987 comedy films
Films produced by Elliott Kastner
1980s American films